The Darfur gerbil (Gerbillus muriculus) is distributed mainly in western Sudan.

References

  Database entry includes a brief justification of why this species is of least concern

Endemic fauna of Sudan
Gerbillus
Rodents of Africa
Mammals described in 1923
Taxa named by Oldfield Thomas
Taxa named by Martin Hinton